Arthur Humphrey Gould (30 August 1927 – 19 September 2000) was a New Zealand rower who won a silver medal representing his country in the men's coxless pair with his brother, David, at the 1950 British Empire Games. Humphrey Gould was also a prominent businessman in Christchurch, rising to become managing director of the stock and station firm Pyne Gould Guinness.

Early life and family
Born in Christchurch on 30 August 1927, Gould came from a well-connected Canterbury family. His father was Derrick William Joseph Gould, a prominent businessman, racehorse owner and captain of the New Zealand polo team, and his mother was Elisabeth Mary Gould (née Elworthy). His paternal grandfather was George Gould, whose father, also called George Gould, was one of the founders in 1851 of the financial agents Gould Beaumont and Company that in 1919 amalgamated with two other firms to become Pyne Gould Guinness, one of New Zealand's largest stock and station agents. Other notable relatives on his father's side of the family include his father's cousin, the historian George Macdonald, and former British Labour MP Bryan Gould, who is a descendant of the elder George Gould. Humphrey's mother was a granddaughter of both Churchill Julius, the first Anglican Archbishop of New Zealand, and Edward Elworthy, an important landowner in South Canterbury. She was thus a first cousin of Charles Elworthy, Baron Elworthy, and niece of Sir George Julius and Awdry Julius.

On 25 October 1927, Humphrey Gould and his twin brother, Robin, were baptised by their great-grandfather, Archbishop Julius, at St Barnabas's Church, Fendalton. Sir Charles Campbell, 12th Baronet, of Auchinbreck was one of their godparents. Gould was educated at Christ's College from 1941 to 1945, where he was a prefect, captain of the rowing team, and played as a lock in the school's 1st XV rugby team.

In 1953, Gould married Betty Ann (Betsy) Simson from Hawke's Bay, and the couple went on to have two children.

Rowing
Gould was a member of the Avon Rowing Club. With his older brother David, he won the coxless pair title at the New Zealand national rowing championships in 1948. The following year, they did not defend their title at the national championships, but instead were members of Avon's crews in the fours and eights; combining with the Lindstrom brothers, they were runners-up in the fours. At the 1950 British Empire Games, raced at Lake Karapiro, Gould again joined with his brother David to contest the men's coxless pair. Coached by Rangi Thompson, they won the silver medal, finishing in a time of 8:10, four lengths behind the victorious Australian crew.

During the 1960s, Gould was a rowing coach and administrator for Canterbury and the University of Canterbury.

Business
After leaving school, Gould joined the family firm, Pyne Gould Guinness, beginning as a mailboy, and working his way up to become managing director in 1973. He also served on the boards of various companies, including Mount Cook Group, and The Press from 1984 to 1987.

Other activities
Gould served as treasurer of the Canterbury Agricultural and Pastoral Association between 1963 and 1977, and was the organisation's president in 1978. He was also a committee member at the Canterbury Jockey Club, and was one of the founders of the Christchurch Squash Club. He became the honorary consul of Sweden in Christchurch in 1981.

Death
Gould died in Christchurch on 19 September 2000. His wife, Betsy, died on 10 April 2012.

References

1927 births
2000 deaths
Rowers from Christchurch
People educated at Christ's College, Christchurch
New Zealand male rowers
Rowers at the 1950 British Empire Games
Commonwealth Games silver medallists for New Zealand
Commonwealth Games medallists in rowing
New Zealand stock and station agents
20th-century New Zealand businesspeople
Julius family
Elworthy family
Medallists at the 1950 British Empire Games